The 2010 Dominion Northern Ontario Men's Curling Championship, was held February 8–14, 2010 in Sudbury, at the Sudbury Curling Club. The winner would represent Northern Ontario at the 2010 Tim Hortons Brier.

Teams

Standings

Scores

February 8
Salo 9-5 Phillips
Scharf 8-2 Belec
Assad 7-6 Pozihun
Gordon 7-6 Lappalainen
Pozihun 6-5 Burgess
Jacobs 7-5 Gordon
Phillips 8-7 Nordin
Dumontelle 8-4 Belec
Jacobs 9-5 Lappalainen
Burgess 7-6 Assad
Dumontelle 8-6 Scharf
Salo 8-4 Nordin

February 9
Gordon 9-8 Dumontelle
Pozihun 7-4 Nordin
Jacobs 11-4 Belec
Burgess 5-2 Phillips
Assad 8-1 Belec
Phillips 9-6 Lappalainen
Gordon 7-6 Salo
Scharf 7-6 Pozihun
Scharf 8-5 Nordin
Dumontelle 10-9 Salo
Burgess 7-1 Lappalainen
Jacobs 8-6 Assad

February 10
Salo 6-5 Burgess
Nordin 8-2 Assad
Jacobs 9-2 Scharf
Lappalainen 8-4 Dumontelle
Phillips 7-6 Jacobs
Burgess 6-4 Belec
Dumontelle 13-9 Pozihun
Nordin 6-5 Gordon
Lappalainen 6-5 Pozihun
Assad 9-3 Gordon
Scharf 9-7 Phillips
Salo 7-4 Belec

February 11
Scharf 7-2 Gordon
Salo 8-3 Pozihun
Lappalainen 9-3 Belec
Assad 11-8 Phillips
Dumontelle 9-3 Assad
Lappalainen 9-7 Nordin
Jacobs 9-3 Salo
Scharf 8-7 Burgess
Belec 9-6 Nordin
Dumontelle 10-7 Phillips
Burgess 10-9 Gordon
Jacobs 7-4 Pozihun

February 12
Dumontelle 5-4 Burgess
Lappalainen 8-5 Scharf
Assad 11-10 Salo
Jacobs 5-4 Nordin
Pozihun 8-3 Gordon
Jacobs 8-7 Burgess
Dumontelle 8-5 Nordin
Phillips 7-4 Belec
Salo 8-4 Lappalainen
Phillips 8-7 Gordon
Belec 12-5 Pozihun
Assad 7-4 Scharf

February 13
Jacobs 8-6 Dumontelle
Burgess 8-2 Nordin
Pozihun 8-7 Phillips
Scharf 10-4 Salo
Lappalainen 10-5 Assad
Belec 9-2 Gordon

Tie breakers
Assad 6-5 Salo
Burgess 6-5 Lappalainen
Assad 10-6 Burgess

Play-off

External links
 Official site
 playdowns.com

2010 Tim Hortons Brier
Curling competitions in Greater Sudbury
2010 in Ontario